Via dei Condotti (named always Via Condotti) is a busy and fashionable street of Rome, Italy.  In Roman times it was one of the streets that crossed the ancient Via Flaminia and enabled people who transversed the Tiber to reach the Pincio hill. It begins at the foot of the Spanish steps and is named after conduits or channels which carried water to the Baths of Agrippa. Today, it is the street which contains the greatest number of Rome-based Italian fashion retailers, equivalent to Milan's Via Montenapoleone, Paris' Rue du Faubourg-Saint-Honoré, Florence's Via de' Tornabuoni or London's Bond Street.

Caffé Greco (or Antico Caffé Greco), perhaps the most famous café in Rome was established at Via dei Condotti 86 in 1760, and attracted figures such as Stendhal, Goethe, Byron, Liszt and Keats to have coffee there.  Guglielmo Marconi, inventor of radio, lived at Via dei Condotti 11, until his death in 1937.

Being near the Spanish steps, the street is visited by large numbers of tourists.  In May 1986, fashion designer Valentino filed suit to close a McDonald's shortly after it opened near the Spanish steps, complaining of "noise and disgusting odours" below his six-story palazzo in the vicinity of Via Condotti.  But to the dismay of some Romans, McDonald's overcame the obstacles and is successful.

Via Condotti is a center of fashion shopping in Rome. Dior, Gucci, Valentino, Hermès, Armani, Jimmy Choo, Rolex, Tudor, Patek Philippe, Prada, Salvatore Ferragamo, Céline, Van Cleef & Arpels, Dolce & Gabbana, Max Mara, Alberta Ferretti, Trussardi, Buccellati, Bulgari, Damiani, Tod's, Zegna, Cartier, Montblanc, Tiffany & Co., Louis Vuitton have stores on Via Condotti.  Others, such as Laura Biagiotti, have their offices there.

Monuments and sights of interest

Lining the stylish street and near the Piazza di Spagna and Largo Goldoni are several structures of touristic, historical or monumental interest.
 Santissima Trinità a Via Condotti (18th century)
 Palazzo degli Ansellini (19th century)
 Palazzo Della Porta Negroni Caffarelli (19th century)
 Palazzo Avogadri Neri (17th century)
 Palazzo di Malta (18th century)
 Palazzo Megalotti (18th century)
 Antico Caffè Greco (18th century)
 Palazzo Maruscelli Lepri (17th century)

Other
The street is nearby and serviced by the Rome Metro station Spagna which opened in 1980. Via dei Condotti is a pedestrian thoroughfare.

References

External links

Shopping districts and streets in Rome
Condotti